Paragon Studios was a video game developer, and wholly owned subsidiary of NCsoft. Founded in November 2007 as NCsoft NorCal, the studio's remit was to further develop the City of Heroes and City of Villains franchises following the acquisition of the titles by NCsoft from Cryptic Studios. In April 2009, NCsoft NorCal was rebranded as Paragon Studios. 
On August 31, 2012, it was announced by the studio that: "NCsoft has made the decision to close Paragon Studios. Effective immediately, all development on City of Heroes will cease and we will begin preparations to sunset the MMORPG before the end of the year."<ref name=cohclose>Farewell, from all of us at Paragon Studios, Farewell, from all of us at Paragon Studios City of Heroes Closure Announcement</ref> City of Heroes shut down on November 30, 2012, ending the studio's existence.

Games
Paragon Studios developed or collaborated on:City of HeroesCity of VillainsCity of Heroes Going Rogue''

References

External links

NCSoft
City of Heroes
Companies based in Mountain View, California
American companies established in 2007
Video game companies established in 2007
Video game companies disestablished in 2012
Defunct video game companies of the United States
Video game development companies
Defunct companies based in the San Francisco Bay Area
American subsidiaries of foreign companies